The Lake Mainit Development Alliance (LMDA)  is an alliance of municipalities or local government units, government line agencies and civil society organizations in Lake Mainit area. Its significant role is to serve as the coordinating body of multi stakeholders in preserving and promoting Lake Mainit ecosystem.

The Creation 
Founded in March 1999, the Alliance was officially formed through a Memorandum of Agreement signed among the member local government units and government line agencies. The Regional Development Council recognized the Alliance per RDC Resolution Number 11 series of 1999.

Governor Francisco Matugas of Surigao del Norte province was the founding chairman of the Alliance in 1999. In 2001–2007 Governor Robert Lyndon S. Barbers of Surigao del Norte served as the chairman of board of trustees. Governor Erlpe John M. Amante of Agusan del Norte elected as the chairman of the board in 2007–2010.

Alliance members 
The members of LMDA includes the Province of Surigao del Norte, Province of Agusan del Norte, Municipalities of Alegria, Mainit, Tubod and Sison in Surigao del Norte, Municipalities of Kitcharao, Jabonga, Santiago and Tubay in Agusan del Norte. The regional government line agencies actively involved in the Alliance includes the National Economic Development Authority (NEDA), Department of Environment and Natural Resources (DENR), Department of Agriculture (DA), Bureau of Fisheries and Aquatic Resources (BFAR), Department of Tourism (DOT) and Philippine Information Agency (PIA).

Project Donors 
The following are the project donors in the Lake Mainit cluster:

Publication 
Since 2006, LMDA started to published official newsletter "The Lake Mainit Chronicle". All published newsletter is posted online at LMDA Official Weblog site. The Program Management Office  also published leaflets and other information-education campaign materials.

References

External links 
 Official Website blog of LMDA
 LMDA News Updates
 Lake Mainit community
 Lake Mainit blogger
 LMDA documents

Lake Mainit
Politics of Agusan del Norte
Politics of Surigao del Norte